Abdoulrahmane "Abdou" Harroui (born 13 January 1998) is a professional footballer who plays as a midfielder for  club Sassuolo and the Morocco national team.

Born in the Netherlands, he represented his native country internationally at youth level, before opting to play for Morocco at senior level.

Club career
Harroui made his Eredivisie debut for Sparta Rotterdam on 24 February 2018 in a game against AZ.

On 31 August 2021, he joined Italian club Sassuolo on initial loan, with a conditional obligation to buy at the end of the 2021–22 season.

International career
Born in the Netherlands, Harroui is of Moroccan descent. He is a former youth international for the Netherlands. He represented Netherlands at the 2021 UEFA European Under-21 Championship, where Netherlands reached the semi-finals, and Harroui was substituted at half-time of that game.

In September 2021, he accepted a call-up to the Morocco national team for the World Cup qualifiers.

Career statistics

Club

References

External links
 
 Ons Oranje U21 Profile
 

1998 births
Dutch sportspeople of Moroccan descent
Footballers from Rotterdam
Living people
Dutch footballers
Netherlands under-21 international footballers
Netherlands youth international footballers
Moroccan footballers
Association football midfielders
Eredivisie players
Eerste Divisie players
Tweede Divisie players
Serie A players
Sparta Rotterdam players
U.S. Sassuolo Calcio players
Dutch expatriate footballers
Moroccan expatriate footballers
Expatriate footballers in Italy
Dutch expatriate sportspeople in Italy
Moroccan expatriate sportspeople in Italy